Mountain guns are artillery pieces designed for use in mountain warfare and areas where usual wheeled transport is not possible. They are generally capable of being taken apart to make smaller loads for transport by horses, humans, mules, tractors, or trucks. As such, they are sometimes called "pack guns" or "pack howitzers". During the American Civil War these small portable guns were widely used and were called "mountain howitzers".

The first designs of modern breechloading mountain guns with recoil control and the capacity to be easily broken down and reassembled into highly efficient units were made by Greek army engineers P. Lykoudis and Panagiotis Danglis (after whom the Schneider-Danglis gun was named) in the 1890s.

Mountain guns are similar to infantry support guns. They are largely outdated, their role being filled by howitzers, mortars, multiple rocket launchers, recoilless rifles and missiles.  Most modern artillery is manufactured from light-weight materials and can be transported fully assembled by helicopters.

See also
 List of mountain artillery

Images

External links

 Popular Science, May 1941,  "The Old Army Army Mule Takes Guns Where Wheels Won't Go" 
 Assembling the Howitzer detail photos showing a 75mm howitzer's various sections being taken off mules and assembled